The 2001 Korean League Cup, also known as the Adidas Cup 2001, was the 15th competition of the Korean League Cup.

Group stage

Group A

Group B

Knockout stage

Bracket

Semi-finals

Final

Suwon Samsung Bluewings won 3–1 on aggregate.

Awards

Source:

See also
2001 in South Korean football
2001 K League
2001 Korean FA Cup

References

External links
Official website
RSSSF

2001
2001
2001 domestic association football cups
2001 in South Korean football